Tanishk Bagchi (born 23 November 1980) is an Indian music producer, composer, singer and lyricist in Hindi films. He is known for tracks like "Bolna", "Ve Maahi", "Aankh Maarey"(recreated), "Dilbar" (recreated), "Jehda Nasha" (recreated) and "Lut Gaye" (recreated).

Early life and background 
Tanishk Bagchi was born to musicians Nandakumar Bagchi and Sharmistha Dash and hails from Kolkata, West Bengal. He attended the Frank Anthony Public School and the Scottish Church College.

Career 
Bagchi released the Bengali-language album City Life in 2007. Bagchi later worked as a music producer alongside Aditya Dev in the song Meherbani, composed and written by Arko Pravo Mukherjee for the film 2014 film The Shaukeens. Bagchi collaborated with lyricist Vayu Srivastava for a single Oopar Oopar Renn De. Anurag Kashyap liked it and led the duo to a person named Ravi Adhikari, a close relative to the director of the 2015 film Tanu Weds Manu Returns, Aanand L. Rai. The duo then made their debut in Bollywood with the song Banno. Before composing for films, he produced and arranged music for TV shows like Thapki...Pyar Ki etc. Bagchi debuted as a solo composer in the song Samandar in Kis Kisko Pyaar Karoon.

In 2017, Bagchi's first single outing for Machine arrived. The album had Dr. Zeus as a guest composer of a dance number. Though the film was a flop in the box office, the songs like Cheez Badi crossed million views on YouTube. In the same year, he, along with Vayu, composed the soundtrack album of the film Shubh Mangal Saavdhan.

Bagchi's first remake song Humma Humma, from the 2017 film Ok Jaanu. was initially disliked, but later went on to receive over 200 million views on YouTube. That same year, he recreated more classic songs like Tamma Tamma, Mere Rashke Qamar, Cheez Badi, etc. He then won the Zee Cine Award for Song of the Year for his song Baarish from Half Girlfriend and the 2018 IIFA Award for Best Music Director for the film Badrinath Ki Dulhania. Tanishk-Vayu's song Kanha got many nominations and the singer Shashaa Tirupati also won one of them.

In 2018,Bagchi composed the soundtrack album of the film Loveyatri, with DJ Chetas-Lijo George and JAM8. Bagchi made his Telugu debut in the song "Adbhutam" from the film Lover. He, along with Vayu, composed the new Red FM Jingle, which includes the voice of Rajnigandha Shekhawat and the lyrics were written by Vayu. He also recreated two songs that year - Dilbar in the film Satyamev Jayate which received 20 million views in its first 24 hours of release on YouTube, and Aankh Maarey for Simmba which became the party anthem of 2018-19 New Year's parties. Aankh Maarey crossed 1 billion views in 2021. The others include Sanu Ek Pal Chain, Gali Gali, Naam Hai Mera, etc. He also collaborated with Himesh Reshammiya in the recreation of Reshammiya's hit track  Aashiq Banaya Apne in Hate Story 4 with additional vocals of Neha Kakkar. He also composed the soundtrack album of Simmba along with one of its two themes. The other theme was composed by S. Thaman and one song in the album, Mera Wala Dance was composed by DJ Chetas-Lijo George.

In 2019, Bagchi was nominated as the best lyricist for his song Ve Maahi from the 2019 film Kesari at the 65th Filmfare Awards. He later released his single "Khud Se Zyada" with the independent record label VYRL originals as a singer-songwriter. His single Vaaste, sung by Dhvani Bhanushali and Nikhil D'Souza became the most viewed Hindi track on YouTube in 2019. The song crossed 1 billion views in 2020. He also composed Makhna song for the Netflix drama Drive. In the same year, he made his debut in Tamil through his song Kadhal Psycho in Saaho (Tamil). The song was composed by him in Telugu, Malayalam, and Hindi as well. He collaborated with Kshmr for the theme song of Good Newwz. In the same album, he composed 4 out of the 7 other songs.

In 2020, Tanishk-Vayu created the Pepsi anthem Swag Se Solo and Holi song Mere Angne Mein. The duo also composed the soundtrack album of the film Shubh Mangal Zyada Saavdhan. Vayu was nominated as the best lyricist for Mere Liye Tum Kaafi Ho a song from that film at the 66th Filmfare Awards. Bagchi recreated 3 songs in Street Dancer 3D. He composed 3 out of 6 songs in the album of Coolie No. 1.

He has also recreated Tip Tip Barsa Pani for Sooryavanshi, which was postponed indefinitely due to the COVID-19 pandemic.

In 2021, he composed and produced the official anthem for Fearless And United- Guards, a game developed by nCore games. The anthem was released by actor-producer Akshay Kumar on 3 January 2021.

Bagchi also composed a song Lut Gaye in the voice of Jubin Nautiyal, the video of which starred Bollywood actor Emraan Hashmi. The song turned out to be a chartbuster. It become the song to have fastest 100 million+ streams across all streaming platforms, first Indian song to have both 1 Million+ as well as 2 Million+ reel videos on Instagram, entered the Billboard Global Excl. U.S. charts, acquired the 1st position on Ormax Heartbeats Top 5 and the audio trended on all short video platforms. As of 6 April 2021, it has more than 380 million views and more than 5 million likes on YouTube. It became the song to be fastest in garnering 500 million views on MX Takatak, a short video platform.

Bagchi composed the song "Har Funn Maula" for the film Koi Jaane Na. The song featured actors Aamir Khan and Elli AvrRam. The song marked the first collaboration between Bagchi and singer Vishal Dadlani, who had earlier criticized the former for remaking the song "O Saki Saki", which was originally created by Vishal–Shekhar. Bagchi's second music video Patli Kamariya had him as the composer and lyricist. He sang the song along with Sukh-E and Parampara Thakur Tandon.

In May 2021, Tanishk Bagchi released his second single outing through the album of the Netflix film Sardar Ka Grandson. He also made his playback debut through the song "Dil Nahi Todna" from the same, written by himself.

Collaborations with other artistes
Tanishk Bagchi's first song as a solo composer Samandar from the film Kis Kisko Pyaar Karoon was sung by Jubin Nautiyal and Shreya Ghoshal. Since then, Bagchi and Nautiyal have collaborated for more tracks- The Humma Song from Ok Jaanu, Tera Junoon from Machine, Socha Hai from Baadshaho, Raat Baaki from Ittefaq, Adbhutam from Lover, Sawarne Lage from Mitron, Akh Lad Jaave from Loveyatri, Bimar Dil from Pagalpanti, Haiya Ho from Marjaavaan. Their most successful collaboration'till date are Lut Gaye Single and Raataan Lambiyan from Shershaah.
 Actress Zahrah S Khan debuted as a singer with Tanishk Bagchi. The 2019 single Khud Se Zyada, which featured both of them, was Khan's first song as a singer. Later, Khan debuted in Bollywood as a singer by singing the rehashed version of Anuradha Paudwal's song Kya Karte The Sajna  for the 2020 film Shubh Mangal Zyada Saavdhan, recreated by Bagchi. The two collaborated for a Gaana Original song called Jogan, which was sung by Khan and Yasser Desai and written and composed by Tanishk Bagchi. Zara Khan also sang the song Nayi Dhoop, a composition by Bagchi for Nikhil Advani's short film "Apartment" in 2020 anthology film Unpaused. In 2021, the two collaborated for Aamir Khan-Elli AvrRam song Har Fun Maula in the film Koi Jaane Na, recreated versions of popular Punjabi songs Sakhiyaan and Lehanga for the films Bell Bottom and Satyameva Jayate 2, respectively. Zara Khan also gave her voice to the background score of Akshay Kumar starrer film Bell Bottom's teaser, created by Tanishk Bagchi. The two had collaborated for Arjun Kapoor and Rakul Preet Singh starrer Dil Hai Deewana song, which also featured the voice of Darshan Raval and was a remake of Hassan Jahangir's song of the same name. For the same actor duo, Bagchi and Khan sang a song "Dil Nahi Todna" from Sardar Ka Grandson.
 Bagchi has collaborated many a times with singer Asees Kaur. The composer-singer duo has delivered hits like Akh Lad Jaave, Bolna, Ve Maahi, Chandigarh Mein, Raja Ganapati, Tu Lagdi Ferrari, Raataan Lambiyan etc.
 Bagchi has collaborated with singer Romy for several songs- Badhaiyan Tenu from Badhaai Ho, Heer Badnaam from Zero, Chamma Chamma from Fraud Saiyyan, Sanu Kehndi from Kesari, Tota Udd from Mission Mangal, Tu Lagdi Ferrari etc.
 Bagchi is credited for the rise of Dhvani Bhanushali in the music industry. One of her first songs, Humsafar, which was originally composed by Akhil Sachdeva for Badrinath Ki Dulhania, was reprised by Bagchi for T-Series Acoustics. Her songs like Leja Re, Koka, Vaaste etc. were compositions of Bagchi. On  working with Bagchi, she commented that he is her mentor. She said, "He has guided me really well. My career is mostly made because of him."
 Bagchi has collaborated with Neha Kakkar many a times since 2017, creating songs with over 100 million views on YouTube. These collaborations are mostly recreations of old iconic songs like Aankh Maarey, Dilbar, O Saki Saki, Ek Toh Kum Zindagani etc. for which the two were criticized by the audience too.

Discography

Hindi film songs

Telugu film songs

Tamil film songs

Other film songs

Bengali singles

Hindi/Punjabi albums and singles

Discography as background score composer

Discography as ad jingle composer 
Red FMJingle (composed along with Vayu)

Discography as a lyricist

Discography as Tanishk-Vayu

Filmography

Music videos

Accolades

Won 
2016
Mirchi Music Award for Critics' Choice Upcoming Music Composer of the Year for "Bolna" from Kapoor & Sons

2017
Myx Music Awards Best Song for "Baarish" from Half Girlfriend
Zee Cine Awards Song of the Year for "Baarish" from Half Girlfriend
International Indian Film Academy Awards for Best Music Director for Badrinath Ki Dulhania along with Amaal Mallik and Akhil Sachdeva
2018
Mirchi Music Awards for Recreated Song of the Year for "Sanu Ek Pal" from Raid
2019
Nickelodeon Kids' Choice Awards India for Favourite Bollywood Movie Song for "Ve Maahi" from Kesari along with Arijit Singh, Asees Kaur

Nominations 
2015
 Most Entertaining Song - BIG Star Entertainment Awards for the song "Banno" from Tanu Weds Manu Returns (Tanishk Vayu)
 GiMA Award for Best Music Debut for the song "Banno" from Tanu Weds Manu: Returns (Tanishk-Vayu)
 Mirchi Music Award for Upcoming Music Composer of The Year for the song "Banno" from Tanu Weds Manu: Returns (Tanishk-Vayu)
2016
 Mirchi Music Award for Upcoming Music Composer of The Year for the song "Allah Hu Allah" from Sarbjit
 Filmfare Award for Best Music Director for Kapoor & Sons along with Amaal Mallik, Badshah, Arko Pravo Mukherjee, Benny Dayal, Nucleya
2017
 Filmfare Award for Best Music Director for Badrinath Ki Dulhania along with Amaal Mallik and Akhil Sachdeva
 Zee Cine Awards for Best Music for Badrinath Ki Dulhania along with Akhil Sachdeva, Amaal Malik, Bappi Lahiri
 Filmfare Award for Best Music Director for Half Girlfriend along with Mithoon, Farhan Saeed, Rishi Rich, Ami Mishra, Rahul Mishra
 Mirchi Music Award for Song of The Year for "Baarish" from Half Girlfriend and Mirchi Music Award for Lyricist of The Year along with Arafat Mehmood
 Filmfare Award for Best Music Director for Bareilly Ki Barfi along with Arko Pravo Mukherjee, Samira Koppikar, Sameer Uddin and Vayu
 International Indian Film Academy Awards for Best Music Direction along with Guru Randhawa, Rajat Nagpal, Amartya Rahut, Santanu Ghatak for Tumhari Sulu
2018
 Mirchi Music Awards for Best Song Producer (Programming and Arranging) along with Azeem Dayani for "Akh Ladd Jaave" from Loveyatri and "Aankh Maarey" from Simmba and for Recreated Song of the Year for "Tere Bin" and "Aankh Maarey" from Simmba and "Dilbar" from Satyameva Jayate
2019
 Filmfare Award for Best Music Director for Kesari along with Arko Pravo Mukherjee, Jasleen Royal, Jasbir Jassi, Chirantan Bhatt, Gurmoh
 Filmfare Award for Best Lyricist for "Ve Maahi" from Kesari
 Mirchi Music Awards for Recreated song of the year for "O Saki Saki" and "Akhiyon Se Goli Maare"

Controversies
Bagchi has been panned by critics over the quantity and quality of his remixes.

In 2019, his remake version of the song O Saki Saki achieved a lot of views but was criticised by the original music director, Vishal Dadlani. In 2020, his remake version of the Delhi-6 song Masakali, titled Masakali 2.0, which was initially supposed to be released as part of the soundtrack of Marjaavaan, was severely criticised by the makers of the original, including composer A. R. Rahman, lyricist Prasoon Joshi and singer Mohit Chauhan.  He was also trolled on entertainment websites and social media platforms.

After the controversy "Masakali 2.0" Tanishk Bagchi also received criticism through memes that spread on twitter. It also refers to the artist Neha Kakkar, where all the memes are mostly aimed at the two for often making remake songs together. Bagchi had earlier said that he didn't want to make remakes in the beginning, but got an opportunity to make the music for "The Humma Song" for Ok Jaanu. Bagchi also received harsh criticism because of the song Zaalima Coca Cola which was sung by Shreya Ghoshal and starred Nora Fatehi. The song was originally released for the action film, Bhuj: The Pride of India. The song was criticized by Pakistani netizens because the film is considered anti-Pakistan, while the original version of this song is a song from Pakistan sung by Noor Jehan. The song also drew criticism for the lyrics used, but others praised the performance of Ghoshal and Fatehi for this song.

References

External links
 
 
 
Tanishk Bagchi On Spotify

Indian film score composers
Jingle composers
Living people
Indian male film score composers
Scottish Church College alumni
University of Calcutta alumni
1980 births
Telugu playback singers
Tamil playback singers
Bollywood playback singers
Hindi-language singers
Musicians from Kolkata